Nadie se meta is a song by the Dominican songwriter and urban artist Ala Jaza. It was released on October 25, 2018 by the label Carbon Fiber Music. The single was a commercial success across some Latin American countries including his natal Dominican Republic.

Music video 

A music video was released on October 25, 2018 to support the single. It was directed by Dominican filmmaker Rodrigo Films a was shot at Santo Domingo, Dominican Republic. The music video has over 34 million views as of July 2019.

Charts

References 

2018 singles
2018 songs